Wang Nok Aen is a sub-district in the Wang Thong District of Phitsanulok Province, Thailand.

Geography
Wang Nok Aen lies in the Nan Basin, which is part of the Chao Phraya Watershed.

Administration
The following is a list of the sub-district's muban, which roughly correspond to the villages:

Temples
The following is a list of Buddhist temples in the Wang Nok Aen Sub-district:
วัดศรีพรหมจักร in muban 2
วัดวังตาครัตนาราม in muban 6
วัดวังดินสอ in muban 1 
วัดวังนกแอ่น in muban 2
วัดบ้านบ่อนาราม in muban 3
วัดน้ำพรม in muban 4
วัดท่าข้ามเมตตาธรรม in muban 5

References

Tambon of Phitsanulok province
Populated places in Phitsanulok province